Yevsyukovo is the name of several rural localities in Russia:
Yevsyukovo, Vologda Oblast, a village in Komyansky Selsoviet of Gryazovetsky District in Vologda Oblast
Yevsyukovo, Yaroslavl Oblast, a village in Slobodskoy Rural Okrug of Danilovsky District in Yaroslavl Oblast